The Pledge of the Tree ( bayʻat ash-shajarah) or Pledge of Satisfaction (Arabic:  bayʻat ar-riḍwān) or Pledge of Ridwan was a pledge that was sworn to the Islamic prophet Muhammad by his Sahaba (companions) prior to the Treaty of Hudaybiyyah (6 AH, 628 CE). The pledge, sworn under a tree, was to avenge the rumoured death of Uthman bin Affan.

Background 

In March 628 CE (6 AH), Muhammad set for Mecca to perform the ritual pilgrimage of Umrah. The Quraysh denied the Muslims entry into the city and posted themselves outside Mecca, determined to offer resistance even though the Muslims did not have any intention or preparation for battle. Muhammad camped outside Mecca at Hudaybiyyah and sent Uthman ibn Affan as his envoy to meet with the leaders of Quraysh and negotiate their entry into the city. The Quraysh caused Uthman to stay longer in Mecca than they originally planned and refused to inform the Muslims of his whereabouts. This caused them to believe that Uthman had been killed by the people of the Quraysh. On this occasion, Muhammad gathered his nearly 1,400 Sahaba and called them to pledge to fight until death and avenge the death of Uthman. This pledge took place under a tree and was thus known as the Pledge of the Tree. During the process of pledging, each Sahaba came before Muhammad and pledged, with his hand on top of Muhammad's.

Aftermath 

The pledge was successful in demonstrating to the Quraysh the determination of the Muslims. They soon released Uthman and sent down an ambassador of their own, Suhayl ibn Amr to negotiate the terms of a treaty that later became known as the Treaty of Hudaybiyyah.

Significance 

The people who took the pledge, also known as the People of the Tree (اصحاب الشجرة aṣḥāb ash-shajarah) are held in high regard by Muslims in general and Sunnis in particular. After the pledge, verses were revealed in the Qur'an commemorating and appreciating the pledge and those who made it:

Due to this verse, the pledge is also known as the Pledge of Acceptance as it was said to be a cause for God's acceptance.

Rashid Rida  explained that for every Companions of the Prophet who pledge during this pledge were regarded universally by Islam teaching as special which such explanation in line with Ibn Hajar al-Asqalani explanation of the Hadith of Bukhari regarding special position of the pledge attendance as the revelation of Hadith Qudse regarding the God's will towards them.

References 

Treaties of Muhammad